The 2020–21 season was the second season of KK Cedevita Olimpija since its establishment in 2019. The club competed in the Slovenian League, the Adriatic League, and the EuroCup.

Cedevita Olimpija won their first trophy of the season, the Slovenian Supercup, on 17 September 2020. In May 2021, they won the Slovenian League title after defeating Krka 3–0 in the final.

Overview 
The ABA League Assembly and the Basketball Federation of Slovenia cancelled their respective competitions for the 2019–20 season due to the COVID-19 pandemic. On 1 July 2020, forward Mikael Hopkins signed a two-year contract extension.

Players

Squad information

 <>

 <>

Players with multiple nationalities
   Tomas Belina
   Ivan Marinković
   Jarrod Jones
   Mangok Mathiang

Depth chart

Transactions

Players In

|}

Players Out

|}

Club

Technical Staff 
In August 2020, Jan Šentjurc joined the coaching staff as an assistant coach, while Dragiša Drobnjak left.

The following was the technical staff of Cedevita Olimpija for the 2020–21 season.

Source: Coaches & Staff

Uniform

Supplier: Adidas
Main sponsor: Cedevita
Back sponsor: Triglav (top), Spar (bottom)
Shorts sponsor: None

Pre-season and friendlies

Competitions

Overall

Overview

Slovenian League 

The club joined the League in the Championship Group of the 2020–21 season.

Standings

Results summary

Results by round

Matches 
Note: All times are CET (UTC+1) as listed by Slovenian League. Some games were played behind closed doors (BCD) due to the COVID-19 pandemic in Slovenia.

Playoffs 
Note: All times are CET (UTC+1) as listed by Slovenian League. Some games were played behind closed doors (BCD) due to the COVID-19 pandemic in Slovenia.

Adriatic League

Regular season

Results summary

Results by round

Matches
Note: All times are local CET (UTC+1) as listed by the ABA League. Some games were played behind closed doors (BCD) due to the COVID-19 pandemic in Europe.

EuroCup

Regular season: Standings

Regular season: Results summary

Regular season: Results by round

Regular season: Matches
Note: All times are CET (UTC+1) as listed by EuroLeague. Some games were played behind closed doors (BCD) due to the COVID-19 pandemic in Europe.

Top 16: Standings

Top 16: Results summary

Top 16: Results by round

Top 16: Matches
Note: All times are CET (UTC+1) as listed by EuroLeague. Some games were played behind closed doors (BCD) due to the COVID-19 pandemic in Europe.

Adriatic Supercup 

The 2020 ABA Super Cup was scheduled to be the fourth tournament of the ABA Super Cup. On 29 June 2020, the ABA League Assembly cancelled the tournament due to the COVID-19 pandemic.

It would have been played between 20 and 23 September 2020 in Podgorica, Montenegro.

Slovenian Cup
The 2021 Slovenian Cup will be the 30th season of the national cup tournament. The club will join the tournament in the quarterfinals.

All times are local UTC+1.

Slovenian Supercup
The 2020 Slovenian Supercup was the 17th season of the Supercup tournament. It was the club's first appearance in the Supercup.

On 7 September 2020, the Basketball Federation of Slovenia announced that Krka would play in the Supercup, following the withdrawal of Koper Primorska due to roster problems. The game was played behind closed doors due to the COVID-19 pandemic in Slovenia.

Individual awards

EuroCup 
MVP of the Week

Adriatic League 
MVP of the Round

MVP of the Month

Statistics

EuroCup

Slovenian Supercup

Notes

References

External links
 
 Cedevita Olimpija at kzs.si

KK Cedevita Olimpija
Cedevita Olimpija
Cedevita Olimpija
Cedevita Olimpija